Sahir Lakhnavi (born Syed Qaim Mehdi Naqvi; 6 September 1931  25 November 2019) was a Pakistani classical Urdu poet and the 20th century's last marsiya writer of Pakistan. He wrote gazals, nazms, qataat-i-tareekh, particularly marsiya and qasida throughout his literary career. He wrote twenty books on multiple subjects, including linguistics, poetry, prosody, seerat, history, theology and tafseer. He also appears to have written to the Persian literature, but his primary contribution appears in Urdu.

He was born as Syed Qaim Mehdi Naqvi on 6 September 1931 in Karachi, India. He was the grandson of Fazil Lakhnavi, an Islamic scholar and son of Nawab Syed Akhtar Hussain Masood Lakhnavi who belonged to Ghufran Ma’ab family. He did his matriculation in 1937 from his hometown, and later attended a government college in Ludhiana for higher education. However, he was suspended from the college due to his uncertain irresponsibility, and he subsequently attended Government Dayal Singh College, Lahore where he was again suspended due to his alleged involvement in biological basis of love. He then obtained Master of Arts and Bachelor of Laws in Karachi. He had four daughters and one son.

Career 
Sahir wrote prose and poetry in Urdu language, however he is primarily recognised for writing  marsiya and qasida besides gazals and nazms. He published most of his work during his aging-associated disease. His research work on mersia titled Marsiya Per Aitrazat Ka Tanqidi Jaiza is recognised one of the prominent publications which covers the history of mersia.

Publications

Death 
He died on 25 November 2019 in Karachi, Pakistan after a chronic medical complication. He is buried in Wadi-e-Hussain cemetery.

References

Further reading 
 
 

1931 births
2019 deaths
20th-century Pakistani poets
Poets from Karachi
Urdu-language poets from Pakistan
Pakistani male poets
Writers from Lucknow